Cañar Canton is a canton of Ecuador, located in the Cañar Province.  Its capital is the town of Cañar.  Its population at the 2001 census was 58,185.

References

Cantons of Cañar Province